Isabey (or Isa Bey) may refer to :

 Persons
 Eugène Isabey (1803–1886), French painter, draftsman and printmaker
 Jean-Baptiste Isabey (1767–1855), French painter born at Nancy
 Michaël Isabey (born 1975), French football midfielder

 Places in Turkey
 the modern Anatolian site of the Ancient town and former Roman bishopric of Lunda (Asia Minor), now a Latin Catholic titular see
 Isabey Mosque or İsa Bey Mosque, on the outskirts of the Ayasluğ Hills at Selçuk, İzmir, named after it builder, an Aydinid from the Anatolian Seljuk beyliks (1374–1375)
 İsabey, Çal
 İsabey, Karakoçan

See also 
 Isabeau